Conservative Democratic Party (KDS) existed in Slovakia in 1993 and 1994. It was merger of Party of Conservative Democrats and Civic Democratic Party. It was led by Pavel Hagyari. In March 1994, party merged into Democratic Party.

References

Conservative parties in Slovakia
Defunct political parties in Slovakia